Capitol Hill is a densely populated residential district in Seattle, Washington, United States. One of the city's most popular nightlife and entertainment districts, it is home to a historic gay village and vibrant counterculture community.

History

In the early 1900s Capitol Hill was known as 'Broadway Hill' after the neighborhood's main thoroughfare. The origin of its current name is disputed. James A. Moore, the real estate developer who platted much of the area, reportedly gave it the name in the hope that the Washington State Capitol would move to Seattle from Olympia. Another story claims that Moore named it after the Capitol Hill neighborhood of Denver, Colorado, his wife's hometown. According to author Jacqueline Williams, both stories are likely true. The neighborhood was frequently referred to as Catholic Hill up until the 1980s due to its large Roman Catholic population.

Capitol Hill is home to some of Seattle's wealthiest neighborhoods, including "Millionaire's Row" along 14th Avenue E. south of Volunteer Park (family residences on tree-lined streets) and the Harvard-Belmont Landmark District. The neighborhood is home to many distinguished apartment houses, including several by Fred Anhalt, as well as a few surviving Classical Revival complexes such as the Blackstone Apartments. The neighborhood's architecture did not fare so well in the post-World War II period; architect Victor Steinbrueck wrote in 1962 of the "tremendous growth of less-than-luxury apartments" that at first "appear to be consistent with the clean, direct approach associated with contemporary architecture" but whose "open outdoor corridors" totally defeat their "large 'view' windows" by giving occupants no privacy if they leave their blinds open to enjoy the view. He added, "most tenants close their blinds and look for another apartment when their lease runs out."

During the George Floyd protests of 2020, Cal Anderson Park and much of the upper Pike-Pine Corridor surrounding the SPD East Precinct were barricaded by protesters and declared the Capitol Hill Autonomous Zone (CHAZ).

Geography
Capitol Hill is situated on a steep hill just east of the city's downtown central business district. It is bounded by Interstate 5 (I-5) to the west (beyond which are Downtown, Cascade, and Eastlake); to the north by State Route 520 and Interlaken Park (beyond which are Portage Bay and Montlake); to the south by E. Pike and E. Madison Streets (beyond which are First Hill and the Central District); and to the east by 23rd and 24th Avenues E. (beyond which is Madison Valley).

Capitol Hill's main thoroughfare is Broadway, the commercial heart of the district. Other major streets in the area are 10th, 12th, 15th, and 19th Avenues, all running north–south, and E. Pine, E. Pike, E. John, E. Thomas, and E. Aloha Streets and E. Olive Way, running east–west. Of these streets, large portions of E. Pike Street, E. Pine Street, Broadway, 15th Avenue, and E. Olive Way are lined almost continuously with street-level retail. The Pike-Pine corridor (the area between Pike and Pine streets) from Boren Avenue through 15th Street is another main thoroughfare in Capitol Hill, full of coffee shops, bars, restaurants, and other food and music businesses. The neighborhood is largely characterized by mid-rise buildings occupied by an eclectic mix of businesses.

Capitol Hill is also the location of half of Seattle's 12 steepest street grades: 21% on E. Roy Street between 25th and 26th Avenues E. (eastern slope), 19% on E. Boston Street between Harvard Avenue E. and Broadway E. (western slope) and on E. Ward Street between 25th and 26th Avenues E. (eastern slope), and 18% on E. Highland Drive between 24th and 25th Avenues E. (eastern slope), on E. Lee Street between 24th and 25th Avenues E. (eastern slope), and on E. Roy Street between Melrose and Bellevue Avenues E. (western slope).

Public Transportation

The Capitol Hill station on the Link light rail 1 Line opened in March 2016 as part of the University Link extension. The 1 Line connects the neighborhood to the University District to the north, and downtown Seattle to the south.

The First Hill Streetcar line, which opened in January 2016, terminates in the neighborhood on Broadway Avenue, just south of the Link light rail station.

Bus transit service to and within Capitol Hill is provided by King County Metro, including routes 10, 12, 43 and 49 of the Seattle trolleybus system. The City of Seattle and King County Metro are under construction on the Rapid Ride G bus line along Madison Street, connecting from downtown Seattle, through First Hill, then Capitol Hill, and beyond to Madison Valley and Madison Park. The bus line will include 6-minute headways during peak times, and center-boarding stations between 9th and 13th avenues.

Culture

Arts and entertainment

Capitol Hill has a reputation as a bastion of musical culture in Seattle and is the neighborhood most closely associated with the grunge scene from the early 1990s, although most of the best-known music venues of that era were actually located slightly outside the neighborhood. The music scene has transformed since those days and now a variety of genres (electronica, rock, punk, folk, salsa, hip hop and trance) are represented.

The neighborhood figures prominently in nightlife and entertainment, with many bars hosting live music and with numerous fringe theatres. Most of the Hill's major thoroughfares are dotted with coffeehouses, taverns and bars, and residences cover the gamut from modest motel-like studio apartment buildings to some of the city's most historic mansions, with the two types sometimes shoulder-to-shoulder.

Capitol Hill is also home to two of the city's best-known movie theaters, both of which are part of the Landmark Theatres chain. Both theaters are architectural conversions of private meeting halls: the Harvard Exit (now closed permanently) in the former home of the Woman's Century Club (converted in the early 1970s) and the Egyptian Theatre, in a former Masonic lodge (converted in the mid-1980s). There is also Seattle's only cinematheque, the Northwest Film Forum, which in addition to screening films, teaches classes on filmmaking and produces film alongside Seattle's burgeoning filmmaking community. These theaters respectively host showings for the Seattle International Film Festival (SIFF) and the Seattle Lesbian & Gay Film Festival every year. The Broadway Performance Hall, located on the campus of Seattle Central College (SCC), also hosts a variety of lectures, performances, and films. The cast of MTV's Real World Seattle: Bad Blood lived in and were filmed in Capitol Hill during 2016.

Since 1997, Capitol Hill has hosted the Capitol Hill Block Party annually in late July, an outdoor music festival that occurs on Pike Street between Broadway and 12th Ave and Union and Pine Street.

Coffeehouses

Besides the large Seattle-based chains—Starbucks, Seattle's Best Coffee (now owned by Starbucks), and Tully's Coffee—Capitol Hill has been home to some of the city's most prominent locally owned coffeehouses. David Schomer's Espresso Vivace on Broadway is credited as the birthplace of artisanal coffee culture and latte art in Seattle and the United States as a whole. The neighborhood is also considered a test market for coffeehouses by Starbucks Corporation, which placed two stealth Starbucks stores on Capitol Hill in 2009 and 2011 that were later closed by 2019.

LGBT community

A bourgeoning counterculture community on Capitol Hill in the mid-20th century became a magnet for LGBT people seeking community acceptance at a time when the city's earlier gay capital in Downtown Seattle's (notoriously rowdy) Pioneer Square was in decline. As a result, large-scale gay residential settlement of Capitol Hill began in the early 1960s, and the district continues to be home to a sizable number of LGBT people, making Capitol Hill Seattle's "gayborhood".

The roots of the LGBT community on Capitol Hill can be traced to a change in the demographics and culture of the city as a whole in the 1950s and 1960s. LGBT Seattleites had long congregated in Pioneer Square, often interchangeably termed "Skid Road," and had built up a community in establishments such as the Double Header, the Casino, and the Garden of Allah (just north of the neighborhood). When the neighborhood, which houses many notable works of Victorian and Edwardian architecture, was targeted for urban renewal (and perhaps even prior), the Seattle Police Department engaged in extortion, allowing illegal homosexual practices and cross-dressing to continue only in bars which paid them off. The payoffs did not always guarantee security, and in 1966, citing alarm over the city's widespread image as a bastion of gay culture and tolerance, SPD planned a major house-cleaning of the gay bars in Pioneer Square. The gay community then began to migrate out of Downtown Seattle.

The rise of American counterculture on the west coast took place during the same period. Although the University District, home to sites such as the Ave, the University of Washington, Parrington Lawn or "Hippie Hill", the Last Exit On Brooklyn coffeehouse, and the Blue Moon Tavern, was the primary hub of 1960s counterculture in Seattle, Capitol Hill also experienced a very noticeable influx of artistic and bohemian life. Largely driven by low rent from "white flight" in the steadily disappearing "auto row" of Capitol Hill's Pike-Pine Corridor neighborhood, LGBT Seattleites began to build the foundations of a community of their own deep in the structure of this evolving neighborhood.

After the Elite Tavern, the first gay bar on Broadway, opened in the 1950s, the LGBT community on the Hill began to grow parallel to its decline in Pioneer Square. By the late 1960s, Capitol Hill was primed to become the local home base of the gay liberation movement and community throughout the decade following the Stonewall riots of 1969 in New York City.

Capitol Hill was the birthplace of many notable LGBT organizations during the first 25 years of the gay rights movement. In July 1969, only a few days after the Stonewall riots, the Dorian Society opened Dorian House in Capitol Hill's Hilltop neighborhood, a locale which soon became an important hub of LGBT youth outreach. Now called Seattle Counseling Service, it was the first mental health organization in the United States specializing in affirming treatment of ostracized LGBT youth. In 1974, the Gay Community Center opened in the Hilltop area. In 1991, Lambert House LGBT youth community center, also in the Hilltop, opened its doors and became a model organization for queer youth outreach. After moving from Downtown in 1982, Seattle's official gay pride parades took place on Capitol Hill for several decades, and the annual festival continues to hold block parties on the Hill. In the 1980s, the Northwest AIDS Foundation, the Chicken Soup Brigade, and the Evergreen Health Advocates formed to combat the growing HIV/AIDS epidemic, and eventually merged to become the Lifelong AIDS Alliance.

The gay and bisexual male community on Capitol Hill was the epicenter of the HIV/AIDS epidemic in the region. In addition to the organizations that would become Lifelong, more services were created to serve the growing health needs of the gay community in the 1990s, including Pike-Pine's Gay City Health Project, formed in 1995. Among the deceased in 1995 was Washington's first openly-gay legislator, Cal Anderson, who was the state congressional representative for Capitol Hill and the University District. In remembrance of Anderson's legacy, Lincoln Reservoir Park, the main Olmstedian centerpiece to the urban landscape of the Broadway, Pike-Pine, and Hilltop neighborhoods which form the core of Capitol Hill's LGBT community, was renamed in his honor. In 2020, the plaza atop Capitol Hill light rail station adjacent to Cal Anderson Park became home to the AIDS Memorial Pathway, a permanent outdoor public art gallery commemorating victims of the HIV/AIDS epidemic. In 2019, the block of E Denny Way at the light rail station that connects Broadway to Cal Anderson Park was renamed E Barbara Bailey Way, after a notable small business owner and LGBT rights activist.

During Pride week of 2015, eleven permanent rainbow crosswalks were painted in the Capitol Hill portion of the Pike-Pine corridor.

In 1993, the oldest gay bar on Broadway, the Elite Tavern, was bombed by neo-Nazis. Capitol Hill has become the target of an increasing number of anti-LGBT hate crimes in the early 21st century.

Landmarks and institutions

Registered Historic Places  on Capitol Hill include the Harvard-Belmont Landmark District, in which is located the original building of the Cornish College of the Arts; Volunteer Park, in which are the Seattle Asian Art Museum and Volunteer Park Conservatory; and The Northwest School. 

In addition to Volunteer Park, parks on Capitol Hill include Cal Anderson Park, Louisa Boren Park, Interlaken Park, Roanoke Park, Pendleton Miller Park, and Thomas Street Park. Lake View Cemetery, containing the graves of Bruce Lee and his son Brandon Lee, lies directly north of Volunteer Park, and the Grand Army of the Republic Cemetery is further north.

Also on the Hill are The Northwest School, Seattle Academy of Arts and Sciences, St. Joseph School, Holy Names Academy, Seattle Hebrew Academy, Seattle Preparatory School, Seattle University, Seattle Central Community College, and St. Mark's Episcopal Cathedral. Additionally, Seattle University is located south of Madison Street, and is considered to be either in Capitol Hill or First Hill.

The oldest African-American church in Seattle is located on 14th Avenue, between E Pike and E Pine streets. The First African Methodist Episcopal Church was originally incorporated in 1891 as the Jones Street Church (when 14th Avenue was called Jones Street). The church was constructed in 1912, replacing the large house where congregations previously met, on the same site. The church structure was designated as a Seattle landmark in 1984.

The First Methodist Protestant Church of Seattle, listed on the National Register of Historic Places, was remodeled and is now occupied by a design and marketing firm.

There is one Jewish synagogue near Capitol Hill. Temple De Hirsch Sinai, whose Alhadeff Sanctuary was designed by B. Marcus Priteca, among others, is just south of Madison Street, placing it technically in the Central District.

In 2021, St Patrick's church on East Edgar Street was named as one of three Catholic churches facing closure in a reorganization plan by the Archdiocese of Seattle.

References

 Kathryn McGrath, "Clubless in Seattle", University of Washington Daily Online, October 3, 1996: on the Teen Dance Ordinance.

External links

 Capitol Hill, Seattle, Washington is at coordinates 
 Heather MacIntosh, Preservation in Capitol Hill, Preservation Seattle (online publication of Historic Seattle), February 2004
 The Seattle Photograph Collection, Capitol Hill - University of Washington Digital Collection

 
Entertainment districts in the United States
Gay villages in the United States
LGBT culture in Seattle